Heorhiy Mykolayovych Kirpa (20 July 1946 in Klubivka, Khmelnytskyi Oblast – 27 December 2004 in Bortnychi, Kyiv) was a Ukrainian railway manager, statesman and politician, best known as the head of the Ukrzaliznytsia national railway company and Minister of Transportation and Telecommunications under President Leonid Kuchma.

Political career 
In May 2002, Kirpa was appointed Minister of Transport by the then President Leonid Kuchma and on April 23 was awarded an honourable title Hero of Ukraine. In a publicly debated move in 2003, the President placed paramilitary railroad armed forces under the direction of Kirpa. Kirpa was a staunch supporter of Prime Minister Viktor Yanukovych, and the BBC described him as "one of the most influential figures" in Yanukovych's government.

Death 
Heorhiy Kirpa was found shot dead at his holiday home in Bortnychi (the outskirt of Kyiv), on 27 December 2004. The official police report states that Kirpa committed suicide.

Remembrance
Late December 2009 the Southwestern Railways requested the Kyiv City Council to rename Petrozavodska Street, which is located in the Solomianskyi Raion of Kyiv, as Heorhiy Kirpa Street. The Bortnychi railway station, the closest to Kirpa's residence and death place, was renamed "Heorhiy Kirpa Station" in his honor by Ukrzaliznytsia.

Key projects
Bridges: New Darnytskyi Bridge
Train stations: Uzhhorod railway station, Darnytsia railway station, Kyiv-Pasazhyrskyi, Karavaevi Dachi railway station
Highways: Highway M05
Other: Sports Palace "Lokomotyv"

References

External links 

 Reaction to his appointment as Minister of Transport

1946 births
2004 deaths
Ukrainian politicians who committed suicide
Suicides by firearm in Ukraine
Ukrainian rail workers
Transport ministers of Ukraine
Recipients of the title of Hero of Ukraine
People from Khmelnytskyi Oblast
2003 Tuzla Island conflict
Revival (Ukraine) politicians
Ukrainian Railways
Laureates of the State Prize of Ukraine in the Field of Architecture
Laureates of the State Prize of Ukraine in Science and Technology
Burials at Baikove Cemetery